Hesperelaea is a plant genus with only one species, probably now extinct. The last collection of the plant on the island was in 1875, so the species and the genus must now be presumed extinct. An intensive search for the plant in 2000 was unsuccessful.

At the time of the collection of the type material in 1875, Hesperelaea palmeri was found only in a single canyon on the east side of the island. It was a shrub with broadly lanceolate leaves up to 5 cm long. Flowers were pale yellow, the petals over 10 mm long. The species was unusual in the family in having fully distinct petals.

Phylogenetic analyses based on DNA from the nuclear genome as well as mitochondrial and chloroplast DNA suggest that H. palmeri is closely related to the genera Forestiera and Priogymnanthus in tribe Oleeae, and perhaps the sister lineage of Forestiera. A molecular clock analysis estimated its divergence from its closest relatives in the Early Miocene, likely pre-dating the age of Guadalupe Island. This suggests that H. palmeri is a paleoendemic that was once more widespread and then retreated to Guadalupe Island following environmental change.

References

External links
Photographs of isotype herbarium specimens at Missouri Botanical Garden:
Herbarium sheet MO-992469
Herbarium sheet MO-992470

Oleeae
Monotypic Oleaceae genera
Flora of Mexican Pacific Islands
Extinct plants